Thula is a town in Yemen.

Thula may also refer to:

 Thula (poetic genre), a poetic genre
 Thula Thula, a private game reserve in Zululand, KwaZulu-Natal province in South Africa
 Al-Thula airbase, Syria, involved in the Daraa and As-Suwayda offensive (June 2015)

See also
Thyle
Thula Baba Box, a maternity package
Colias tyche thula (thula sulphur), a butterfly
Brachylomia thula, a moth
Egretta thula (snowy egret), a small white heron
Tasmantrix thula, a moth
Thula-thula, a novel by Annelie Botes